"Swanky Street" is a maxi single by the Japanese rock band The Pillows. The song was included on their 1997 release Please Mr. Lostman. "Swanky Street" was featured ending music on an Asahi TV music program.

The single also includes a cover of the Prince song "When You Were Mine".

Track listing
"Swanky Street"
"Spiky Goose"
"When You Were Mine"

1996 singles
The Pillows songs
1996 songs
King Records (Japan) singles
Song articles with missing songwriters